University of Mataram (Unram) is a public university in Mataram, West Nusa Tenggara, Indonesia. It was established on October 1, 1962. Its current rektor is Prof. Ir. Bambang Hari Kusumo, M.Agr.St., PhD.  The previous rektor from 2018-2022 was Dr. Lalu Husni, S.H, M.Hum.

Schools
The university has 10 faculties:
 Faculty of Education and Teacher Training, Dean : Prof. Dr. H. A Wahab Jufri, M.Sc.
 Faculty of Economics: Accounting, Management, Development Study. Dean : Dr. Muaidy Yasin,
 Faculty of Engineering : Civil Engineering, Mechanical Engineering, Electrical Engineering, Informatics Engineering, Architect . Dean : Muhamad Syamsu Iqbal, S.T., M.T., Ph.D.,
 Faculty of Mathematics and Sciences : Mathematics, Biology, Chemistry, Physics. Dean : Prof. Ir. I Made Sudarma,
 Faculty of Law. Dean : Prof. Dr. Muhammad Husni,
 Faculty of Agriculture : Agroecotechnology, Agribusiness, Fishery, Forestry. Dean : Dr. Ir. Kertanegara,
 Faculty of Food and Agroindustrial Technology : Food Technology, Agricultural Engineering. Dean : Prof. Ir. Eko Basuki,
 Faculty of Medicine. Dean : Prof. Mulyanto
 Faculty of Animal Science. Dean : Dr. Maskur,
 Faculty of Post Graduate. Dean : Ir. I Gede Ekaputra Gunartha,

History
The process of the establishment of the University of Mataram began with the establishment of the Preparatory Committee on the Establishment of the State University of Mataram-based PTIP Decree number 89/62 dated June 26, 1962. The committee was chaired by the Governor of the Province of NTB, namely R. Ar. Moh. Ruslan tjakraningrat. Preparatory committee was then formed the Preparatory Committee, which consists of two parts, namely Core Part  (governor, commander, Chief Constable, and Head of Branch Attorney) and Section Organizers (Section Lessons chaired by Drs. Soeroso, MA and Section Material chaired by Sadili Sastrawidjaja, SH). The Preparatory Committee produced two basic proposals, namely: a) Establishment of the Faculty of Economics, Faculty of Animal Science and the Faculty of yangmenghasilkan agronomist; b) Alternative name University: Sangkareang or MATARAM.

Based on the proposal forwarded by the Preparatory Committee of the Preparatory Committee, stipulated the establishment of the State University based in Mataram with PTIP Decree No. 139/62 dated November 3, 1962. Until one year after the publication of the decree, there was no activity that marked the functioning of the university that upon request Governor, on November 17, 1963 Sangkareang Education Foundation opened Faculty of Economics which was expected to be one of the faculty at the State University in Mataram.

The Preparatory Committee disbanded on December 7, 1963 as its work had otherwise been completed. On December 19, 1963 Sangkareang Education Foundation handed Faculty of Economics, the following 41 students to the Governor for further unveiled by PTIP. At that time the State University of Mataram officially started its activities. On this basis Mataram University commemorating the anniversary on December 19. But after a series of processes is observed re-establishment, that determined later Anniversary celebrated on every October 1.

In 1967, the University of Mataram opened three faculties at the same time, the Faculty of Agriculture (1967), Faculty of Animal Husbandry (1967) and the Faculty of Law (1967). At that time the University of Mataram was still a Presidiumschop.

Based on the decision of the University Senate Meeting Mataram March 8, 1968, presidiumschop converted into rectorschop. The Senate decision was strengthened by the Decree of the Director General of Higher Education number 156 / KT / I / SP / 68 which set a start date of March 1, 1968 presidiumschop University of Mataram be rectorschop.

During its development, until the academic year of 2011/2012 the University of Mataram had 9 faculties. Five faculty that were formed after the Law Faculty are the Faculty of Education (Teacher Training & Science Education), established by Decree Rector of the University of Mataram number 102 / PT.21 / H4 / 1981 dated 25 April 1981. Then the Faculty of Engineering, the faculty was established based on changes in the status of the College Engineering Mataram (STTM) into a Civil Engineering Program corresponding Decree of the Director General of Higher Education number 68 / Dikti / Kep / 1991 dated November 8, 1991. Based on the Decree of the Minister of Education and Culture number 0375 / o / 1993 dated October 21, 1993 was officially established Faculty of Engineering at the University of Mataram. The last three faculty are the Faculty of Mathematics and Natural Sciences and the Faculty of Medicine, each based on the Decree of the Rector of the University of Mataram No. 10146 / H18 / 2007 dated August 25, 2007 and the Decree of the Rector of the University of Mataram No. 10147 / H18 / 2007 dated August 25, 2007, as well as the Faculty of Food Technology and Agro-industry with Mataram University Rector Decree No. 1569 / UN18 / HK.00.01 / 2012 dated 4 February 2012. Postgraduate Program was established by the Decree of the Rector of the University of Mataram No. 8251 / J18.H / HK.01.11 / 2005 dated 8 September 2005 which manages the Master and Doctoral Program. Mataram University currently manages 54 programs comprising 1 Doctoral Program (S3), 12 Masters, 34  Bachelor's degrees and 8 Diplomas.

Mataram University Central Office for the first time held at Taman Mayura Cakranegara (a historic site for Indonesia), then moved to Jalan Pendidikan 37 Mataram. Finally, since 1993, the Rectorate building is now located at Jalan Majapahit 62  Mataram (Unram) is a university under the National Education Ministry, based in Mataram City, Nusa Tenggara Barat Province. The founding began with the formation of the Preparatory Committee for the Establishment of the State University of Mataram by PTIP Decree number 89/62 dated June 26, 1962. The committee was chaired by the Head of the Provincial Governor of NTB.

Universitas Mataram established their first office at Taman Mayura Cakranegara (a historical site for Indonesian), then move to Jalan Pendidikan 37 Mataram, and finally since 1993 occupies current Rectorat Building at Jalan Majapahit 62 Mataram

Notable alumni 

 Mesir Suryadi, former member of the People's Representative Council

References

https://unram.ac.id/en/?page_id=2048

External links
 Official site

Universities in Indonesia
Educational institutions established in 1962
Universities in West Nusa Tenggara
Indonesian state universities